Events from the year 1959 in Jordan.

Incumbents
Monarch: Hussein 
Prime Minister: Samir al-Rifai (until 6 May), Hazza' al-Majali (starting 6 May)

Events

Sports

 1959 Jordan League

Establishments

Al-Yarmouk FC.

See also

 Years in Iraq
 Years in Syria
 Years in Saudi Arabia

References

 
1950s in Jordan
Jordan
Jordan
Years of the 20th century in Jordan